Lewis Herold Brown (February 13, 1894February 27, 1951) was an industrialist and former Chairman of Johns-Manville, once the world's largest manufacturer of asbestos and asbestos products.

Early life and career
Born in Creston, Iowa on February 13, 1894, he attended the University of Iowa in 1915.  Brown served in France as an infantry captain during World War I.  After the war, Brown was employed by Montgomery Ward and was promoted to Assistant General Operating Manager within eight years.

Johns-Manville and the Asbestos Institute
T.F. Merseles, the President of Montgomery Ward, left in 1928 to become President of asbestos manufacturer Johns Manville, taking Brown with him.  Merseles died suddenly in 1930 and  Brown was appointed president at the age of 35.
He thereby became the youngest man ever to hold that position in the company's history.  He was also President of the Asbestos Institute.

Brown was awarded The Franklin Institute's Vermilye Medal in 1938.  In April 1939,  Brown was featured on the cover of Time Magazine, with the caption "Businessman Brown -- Public Relations Begins at Home."

A Report on Germany
During World War II Brown served as an advisor to General Levin H. Campbell, Jr. After World War II, at the request of General Lucius D. Clay, Brown wrote a book entitled "A Report on Germany" (Farrar, Straus and Company, New York, 1947), which served as a detailed recommendation for the reconstruction of post-war Germany, and served as a basis for the Marshall Plan.

Later life
Brown founded the American Enterprise Association (AEA) in New York, a think tank which later moved to Washington, D.C., and was renamed the American Enterprise Institute. He served as AEA's chairman until his death. Brown also co-founded the Tax Foundation and served as chairman.

Brown died from a heart ailment on February 27, 1951, at age 57, in Delray Beach, Florida.  He was buried in Putnam Cemetery in Greenwich CT.

Controversy
In 1984, thirty-three years after Brown's death, Johns-Manville was alleged to have prioritized profits over the health and safety of employees during the time of his leadership.  According to testimony given in a federal court by Charles H. Roemer, formerly an employee of Unarco, describing a meeting between Unarco officials, Lewis H. Brown and J-M attorney Vandiver Brown in the early 1940s, "I’ll never forget, I turned to Mr. Brown, one of the Browns made this crack (that Unarco managers were a bunch of fools for notifying employees who had asbestosis), and I said, ‘Mr.Vandiver Brown do you mean to tell me you would let them work until they dropped dead?’ He said, ‘Yes. We save a lot of money that way.'"

References

External links 

Johns Manville historical publications archived by JM Retirees Association
American Enterprise Institute
Time Magazine COVER April 3, 1939
Time Magazine ARTICLE April 3, 1939

American Enterprise Institute
1894 births
1951 deaths
Asbestos
People from Creston, Iowa